James Schofield may refer to:
 James Schofield (cricketer, born 1978) , English cricketer
 James Schofield (cricketer, born 1854) (1854–?), English cricketer
 James Hargrave Schofield (1866–1938), politician in British Columbia, Canada
 James Schofield, a character in the TV series Hotel Babylon